Corruption in Switzerland describes the prevention and occurrence of corruption in Switzerland.

Extent

Government

Switzerland has a legal framework to combat corruption and several authorities are in charge of curbing the levels of it, particularly when it comes to corruption within Swiss financial institutions. Several sources suggest that the country's fight against corruption has been effective.  However, efforts to combat corruption, especially with respect to political party financing have been described as unsatisfactory.

The Council of Europe's Group of States Against Corruption (GRECO) noted in its 2017 evaluation the specific features of Switzerland's institutions which inspire public confidence in those institutions. The GRECO report also identified three problem areas: potential conflicts of interest in politicians, a potential lack of objectivity in federal judges, and a lack of transparency in the internal operations of the Office of the Attorney General. Finally, GRECO recommended that formal codes of conduct be adopted in these three areas.

On Transparency International's 2021 Corruption Perceptions Index, Switzerland scored 84 on a scale from 0 ("highly corrupt") to 100 ("highly clean"). When ranked by score, Switzerland ranked number 7 among the 180 countries in the Index, where the country ranked number 1 is perceived to have the most honest public sector. In a 2020 report Transparency International noted that political funding, whistleblower protections and combating money laundering were all issues in Switzerland.

The Transparency International Global Barometer 2013 shows that 58% of the surveyed households believe that corruption has not changed over the past two years, and 28% believe that it has actually increased. The same survey also shows that political parties are considered the most corrupt institution in Switzerland.

Cases of excessive force, lengthy detention and abuse against migrants or asylum seekers have been reported. In some cases police officers have been given suspended sentences or suspended fines for using excessive force while arresting individuals.

Nepotism is considered an issue when dealing with corruption since many people know each other given the close proximity and social, economic and military structures in Switzerland.

Business

Regarding business and corruption, companies do not consider corruption a problem for doing business in Switzerland, and Swiss companies are active in Corporate Social Responsibility that are generally in line with OECD Guidelines for multinational enterprises.

But the Swiss system has also enabled some types of organisation to operate with little or no transparency or oversight such as those linked to commodities trade. 
According to the OECD: 

Some recent examples include Novartis paying $729 million to settle bribery cases in the United States and Greece in 2020 or Zurich-based bank Julius Baer admitting to laundering over $36 million in bribes in a FIFA case in 2021. Credit Suisse was prosecuted in a Mozambique “tuna bonds” corruption scandal in the United States. In 2022, Glencore paid up to $1.5 billion in penalties to resolve corruption claims with US, UK and Brazilian authorities.

Banking

In 2018, the Tax Justice Network ranked Switzerland's banking sector as the "most corrupt" in the world due to a large offshore banking industry and very strict secrecy laws. These laws allow money laundering and hiding illegally obtained wealth. The Tax Justice Network's ranking attempts to measure how much assistance the country's legal systems provide to money laundering, and to protecting corruptly obtained wealth. However, Berlin-based Transparency International ranked Switzerland as the world's 7th least corrupt country in 2021. However, Transparency International is a German voluntary association with its founders themselves having strong ties to the Swiss banking sector.

The enabling industry refers to lawyers, fiduciaries, notaries, and real estate agents who are helping the criminals invest or hide their ill-gotten monies. Their activity is not covered by the Swiss Anti-Money Laundering Act for as long as they are only advising clients to place money in a particular financial institution or country.

Sports

Switzerland is at the center of sports corruption because many international sports organizations are headquartered there. For example, international sporting organisations (ISO's) can have the legal status of an international Non Governmental Organisation. Encouraged by the resulting range of legal and fiscal privileges, some 53 international sports organisations have their head office in Switzerland, with 46 of them in the Canton de Vaud alone. These include FIFA and the IOC.

See also 
 Crime in Switzerland
 2015 FIFA corruption case
 International Anti-Corruption Academy
 Group of States Against Corruption
 International Anti-Corruption Day
 ISO 37001 Anti-bribery management systems
 United Nations Convention against Corruption
 OECD Anti-Bribery Convention
 Transparency International

References

External links
Switzerland Corruption Profile from the Business Anti-Corruption Portal

 
Switzerland
Crime in Switzerland by type
Politics of Switzerland
Switzerland